Matheus Bonifácio Saldanha Marinho (born 19 August 1999), commonly known as Saldanha, is a Brazilian footballer who plays as a forward for Premier League club Neftchi.

Club career
Born in Uberaba, Minas Gerais, Saldanha joined Bahia's youth setup in 2018, initially on loan from Audax. On 1 July 2019, after impressing with the under-20 side, he was bought outright and signed a permanent three-year contract.

Saldanha was promoted to the first team for the 2020 season, and made his senior debut on 22 January of that year by starting in a 1–1 Campeonato Baiano away draw against Juazeirense. He scored his first senior goal on 9 February, netting his team's second in a 3–1 away win against Jacobina.

Saldanha made his Série A on 12 August 2020, coming on as a second-half substitute for Rossi in a 1–0 home win against Coritiba. His first goal in the category occurred on 16 September, as he scored his team's second in a 2–3 away loss against Corinthians.

In 2021, Saldanha joined to J2 club, JEF United Chiba on loan transfer. One year later, he was announcement officially permanently transfer to JEF United Chiba has been confirmed after a season as loan player from EC Bahia.

In 2022, Saldanha loaned again to Chinese Super League club, Chengdu Rongcheng for during mid 2022 season. He leave from the club after a half season at Chengdu expiration contract.

He return to JEF United Chiba from 2023 season.

Career statistics
.

Honours
Bahia
Campeonato Baiano: 2020

References

External links

Bahia profile 

1999 births
Living people
People from Uberaba
Brazilian footballers
Association football forwards
Campeonato Brasileiro Série A players
Esporte Clube Bahia players
J2 League players
Chinese Super League players
JEF United Chiba players
Chengdu Rongcheng F.C. players
Brazilian expatriate footballers
Brazilian expatriate sportspeople in Japan
Expatriate footballers in Japan
Sportspeople from Minas Gerais